The 1962 Inter-Cities Fairs Cup Final was the final of the fourth Inter-Cities Fairs Cup. It was played on 8 September and 12 September 1962 between Valencia and Barcelona of Spain, it was the first time that two football teams from the same country had contested a European final. It was Valencia's first major European trophy.

Valencia won the tie 7–3 on aggregate after winning the first leg by wide margin, although they were losing twice before getting the win. The second leg ended in a tie.

Route to the final

Match details

First leg

Second leg 

Valencia CF win 7–3 on aggregate

See also 
 1961–62 Inter-Cities Fairs Cup
 Valencia CF in European football
 FC Barcelona in international football competitions
 Spanish football clubs in international competitions

Notes

References 

 RSSSF

2
Inter-Cities Fairs Cup Final 1962
Inter-Cities Fairs Cup Final 1962
1962
International club association football competitions hosted by Spain
1962–63 in Spanish football
September 1962 sports events in Europe
1960s in Barcelona
Sports competitions in Barcelona
1962 in Catalonia